Salang may refer to:
 Salang (language), a language spoken in Laos and Vietnam

Places
Salang, Nepal, a town in Nepal
Salang, Malaysia, a tourist village, bay, and beach at Tioman Island
Salang, Aceh, Indonesia
Salangbato, a barangay in Famy, Philippines

Afghanistan
North Salang, a village in Baghlan Province
Salang District, a district of Parwan Province
Salang mountains, in Parwan and Baghlan Provinces
Salang Pass, major mountain pass connecting Parwan and Baghlan provinces
Salang River, a tributary of the Ghorband River
Salang Tunnel, a tunnel at the Salang Pass in the Hindu Kush mountains

Norway
Salangen, a municipality in Troms county
Salangsverket, a village and industrial site in the municipality of Salangen
Salangsdalen, a river valley in the municipality of Bardu in Troms county